Phagocata is a genus of planariid triclad.

Species
The following species are recognised in the genus Phagocata:

Phagocata albata 
Phagocata albissima 
Phagocata altaica 
Phagocata angusta 
Phagocata arethusa 
Phagocata armeniaca 
Phagocata asymmetrica 
Phagocata bosniaca 
Phagocata bulbosa 
Phagocata bursaperforata 
Phagocata carolinensis 
Phagocata cavernicola 
Phagocata coarctica 
Phagocata cornuta 
Phagocata coronata 
Phagocata crenophila 
Phagocata dalmatica 
Phagocata delamarei 
Phagocata fawcetti 
Phagocata flamenca 
Phagocata fontinalis 
Phagocata gallaeciae 
Phagocata gracilis 
Phagocata graeca 
Phagocata hamptonae 
Phagocata hellenica 
Phagocata holleri 
Phagocata illyrica 
Phagocata iwamai 
Phagocata kawakatsui 
Phagocata leptophallus 
Phagocata macedonica 
Phagocata maculata 
Phagocata mesorchis 
Phagocata monopharyngea 
Phagocata morgani 
Phagocata nivea 
Phagocata nordeni 
Phagocata notadena 
Phagocata notorchis 
Phagocata ochridana 
Phagocata olivacea 
Phagocata opisthogona 
Phagocata papillifera 
Phagocata paravitta 
Phagocata paravittoides 
Phagocata pellucida 
Phagocata procera 
Phagocata prosorchis 
Phagocata pygmaea 
Phagocata pyrenaica 
Phagocata racovitzai 
Phagocata sibirica 
Phagocata spuria 
Phagocata stankovici 
Phagocata subterranea 
Phagocata suginoi 
Phagocata tahoena 
Phagocata teletzkiana 
Phagocata tenella 
Phagocata teshirogi 
Phagocata tigrina 
Phagocata tshukotica 
Phagocata ullala 
Phagocata undulata 
Phagocata velata 
Phagocata vernalis 
Phagocata virilis 
Phagocata vitta 
Phagocata vivida 
Phagocata woodworthi

References 

Continenticola